Ciro Luis Urriola Garrés (3 July 1863 – 26 June 1922) was a Panamanian politician.

He returned to Panama in 1888 to practice his profession. In 1893 he was in charge of Health Medicine of the Port of Panama for four years. He travels to Paris and in 1898 he studies bacteriology and nervous diseases. Then he settles down in Dublin where he obtains a diploma in bachelor's degree, which is now obstetrics. He returned to Panama in 1901, in the middle of the thousand-day war, where his adherence to liberalism caused him problems. After independence, he was a member of the National Constituent Convention. In 1903, he was appointed a doctor in the service of policemen and prisoners of the old Hospital Santo Tomás, and since then he has been dedicated to the study of malaria. In 1904 he returned to Paris as a delegate of the Tuberculosis Congress and went to Rome where he studied malaria.

He was elected as the third presidential designate by the National Assembly for the term 1914–1916, and as the first presidential designate for the term 1916–1918.

When President Ramón Maximiliano Valdés died in 1918, Urriola became the President from 3 June 1918 to 1 October 1918.

References 

1863 births
1922 deaths
People from Panama City
Presidents of Panama
Vice presidents of Panama
Panamanian people of Basque descent